Shahid Shabbir or Baba ji is a Pakistani Historian, researcher and journalist. He is also radio host at Radio Sade Aala 87.8 FM in New Zealand. He is known for his work on discovering and restoring Sikh and Hindu religious places left in Pakistan after 1947 Partition of Punjab.
https://indianexpress.com/article/pakistan/neglected-partition-cattle-shed-pak-orders-restoration-gurdwara-where-nanak-visited-7992484/

See also
Sikhism in Pakistan
Sikh History in Pakistan
Khalsa Raj Foot Steps in Pakistan
History of Punjab
History of Hinduism
History of Buddhism
History of Jainism
History of Islam 
British Raj
Sikh Tourism in Pakistan
Garden Landscape Designer

References

12.https://indianexpress.com/article/pakistan/neglected-partition-cattle-shed-pak-orders-restoration-gurdwara-where-nanak-visited-7992484/

Living people
21st-century Pakistani historians
Historians of Pakistan
Pakistani essayists
Pakistani journalists
Year of birth missing (living people)